The Mouse Exterminator is a 1940 short animated film in the Phantasies series, produced and distributed by Columbia Pictures. It marks the final theatrical appearance of Krazy Kat, the title character from George Herriman's comic strip.

Plot
Krazy, as the cartoon's title implies, is a mouse exterminator, and in his office. He immediately receives a phone call about a rodent problem.

The cat arrives at the home of his caller. Unable to grasp the mouse out of the hole in the wall, Krazy decides to attract the mouse out using a wind-up toy looking like a girl mouse. Although he successfully lured the little nuisance out and even got his paws on it, the mouse is able to return to its lair. Krazy then resorts to using a rifle and starts firing at the hole. The mouse then shows up in front of Krazy, claiming to be powerless, and seemingly asks for mercy. Krazy falls for the pretense and starts to feel guilty. When the two shake hands, the mouse pulls Krazy into the hole until the cat's head is crammed in. The mouse begins pummeling Krazy's face like a speed bag. When Krazy returns to firing his rifle at the hole, the mouse repeats the same trick before pounding the cat with a mallet.

Having enough of the mouse's trickery, Krazy takes a vacuum cleaner to pull in his prey. As the mouse gets sucked in the cleaner, Krazy believes he solved the problem as calls the homeowner. But the mouse comes out of the vacuum bag and is determined to get back at Krazy. The mouse switches on the vacuum near an unsuspecting Krazy who then gets sucked in with only his head sticking out. The cartoon ends with Krazy receiving one final blow to the face.

See also
 Krazy Kat filmography

References

External links

The Mouse Exterminator at the Big Cartoon Database

1940 animated films
1940 short films
1940s American animated films
1940s animated short films
American animated short films
American black-and-white films
Columbia Pictures short films
Animated films about mice
Krazy Kat shorts
Screen Gems short films
Columbia Pictures animated short films